Holy Family Catholic High School is a Roman Catholic secondary school in Victoria, Minnesota, United States.  The school was opened in the fall of 2000 serving only freshman and sophomore students. It now serves grades 9–12.

Athletics
Holy Family Catholic has been a member of the Wright County Conference since 2012.

Notable alumni
Shane Gersich, professional ice hockey player.

References

Roman Catholic Archdiocese of Saint Paul and Minneapolis
Educational institutions established in 2000
Catholic secondary schools in Minnesota
Lasallian schools in the United States
Private high schools in Minnesota
2000 establishments in Minnesota